Jens Nygaard (26 Oct 1931 - 24 Sep 2001) was an American orchestra conductor. He founded the Jupiter Symphony in 1979 in New York with a grant from the Rockefeller Foundation. He was also the subject of a documentary entitled Life on Jupiter by Martin Spinelli.

References

1931 births
2001 deaths
American male conductors (music)
20th-century American conductors (music)
20th-century American male musicians